Denis Yevgenyevich Makarov (born 18 February 1998) is a Russian professional footballer who plays as a right midfielder for Dynamo Moscow.

Club career
He made his debut in the Russian Professional Football League for FC Orenburg-2 on 27 July 2017 in a game against FC Chelyabinsk.

He made his Russian Football National League debut for FC Neftekhimik Nizhnekamsk on 7 July 2019 in a game against FC Mordovia Saransk.

On 6 January 2020 he signed a 3.5-year contract with FC Rubin Kazan. He made his Russian Premier League debut for Rubin on 1 March 2020 in a game against FC Tambov. He substituted Khvicha Kvaratskhelia in the 89th minute. He scored his first RPL goal on 5 July 2020 in a 1–0 victory over FC Orenburg.

On 6 August 2021, he signed a five-year contract with Dynamo Moscow. He was voted player of the month by Dynamo fans for December 2021.

International career
He represented Russia at the 2021 UEFA European Under-21 Championship, where they were eliminated at group stage. Makarov was included in the Squad of the Tournament.

On 11 May 2021, he was included in the preliminary extended 30-man Russia squad for UEFA Euro 2020. That was the first time he was called up to the senior national team. On 2 June 2021, he was included in the final squad. He did not appear in any games as Russia was eliminated at group stage.

Honours

Individual
 Russian Professional Football League Zone Ural-Privolzhye best young player (2018–19).
 Russian Premier League Goal of the Season: 2020–21 (Rubin 2–1 Zenit, 8 March 2021)
 Russian Premier League Goal of the Month: September 2022 (Dynamo 2–1 Ural, 3 September 2022)

Career statistics

Club

Honours
Individual
UEFA European Under-21 Championship Team of the Tournament: 2021

References

External links

 
 
 Profile by Russian Professional Football League

1998 births
Sportspeople from Tolyatti
Living people
Russian footballers
Association football midfielders
FC Neftekhimik Nizhnekamsk players
FC Rubin Kazan players
FC Dynamo Moscow players
Russian Premier League players
Russian First League players
Russian Second League players
Russia under-21 international footballers
UEFA Euro 2020 players
FC Orenburg players